Paulo Rabello de Castro (born 4 January 1949) is a Brazilian economist, incumbent president of the Brazilian Development Bank (BNDES). He was also the president of Brazilian Institute of Geography and Statistics (IBGE). For both offices, Rabello was appointed by president Michel Temer.

On 18 November 2017, he was launched by the Social Christian Party (PSC) as pre-candidate for President of Brazil in the 2018 elections. The party wants to spread an image of liberal christians by using the economist as a reference. His candidacy was confirmed in the party's convention on 20 July 2018. However, Rabello stepped down and the party nominated him vice presidential candidate along with Senator Alvaro Dias.

Bibliography

References

1949 births
Living people
People from Rio de Janeiro (city)
Federal University of Rio de Janeiro alumni
Brazilian economists
Social Christian Party (Brazil) politicians
Social Democratic Party (Brazil, 2011) politicians
Candidates for Vice President of Brazil